The Old Vanderburgh County Courthouse, often simply called the "Old Courthouse," was once the center of Vanderburgh County, Indiana government. Construction started in the spring of 1888 and was completed in November 1890. The building was ready to be occupied by the county government in early 1891.  It sits in the heart of downtown Evansville.

The building was designed by architect Henry W. Wolters of Louisville, Kentucky and constructed by the Charles Pearce & Company of Indianapolis. The 19th century German Beaux-Arts architecture masterpiece cost $379,450 to build. The Old Courthouse occupies an entire city block, bounded by Court, Fourth, Vine and Fifth Streets, with each side being encrusted with sculptures and stone carvings in Indiana limestone.  The fourteen main statues of human figures are the work of Franz Engelsmann, who studied under the great German masters before setting up his studio in Chicago.  In addition, carvings of vegetables, fruits, and flowers indigenous to the area adorn the capitals of the forty-eight pairs of pilasters around the entire building.

Before the courthouse was built, the site was a basin where canal boats on the Wabash and Erie Canal would deliver cargo and turn around for the return trip north. After the advent of the railroads and the canal's abandonment, the site was filled in and the courthouse was constructed upon it.

A tunnel runs beneath Vine Street connecting the Old Courthouse to the Old Vanderburgh County Jail.

Architecture

The tower

The bell tower rises above the Old Courthouse to a height of  The first level of the tower is enclosed with windows which allow sunlight to enter. The next level is open and houses the  Old Courthouse bell. The bell, manufactured by McShane Bell Foundry located in Baltimore, Maryland, has tolled at the Old Courthouse since August 20, 1890. The next level is enclosed and houses only the pulleys and inner workings of the clock. Finally, found on this level of the tower is a suspended staircase which winds to the top of the copper-clad central dome of the Old Courthouse; the base of the cupola sits atop the dome.

Court Street entrance
Protecting the Court Street entryway to the Old Courthouse is a great eagle with its wings widespread perched upon a shield, denoting not only the national emblem but a standard of the ancient Romans.  Directly below the eagle are large Roman numerals carved into the limestone, showing the date when construction began.  Facing the Old Courthouse, to the left sits the Goddess of Manufacturing and Industry who holds a hammer in her right hand, which rests upon an anvil, and the cogwheel of industry in her left.  To her left side sits a locomotive depicting the mode of transportation prevalent at the time. To the right sits the Goddess of Agriculture resting her left hand on a plow and surrounded by symbols of the farm: a sheaf of grain, a hamper of vegetables, and a bee hive. Above the arches of the doorway proper are two cherubs. The one on the left is female as it is holding a nest, thus the care giver; the one on the right is male, holding a bow and quiver, hence the hunter.

Fourth Street entrance
High above the Fourth Street entryway to the Old Courthouse sits a grouping of three statues thought to represent the quest for knowledge and truth. The central figure wears a crown and holds a crusader's sword in her left hand while decidedly posturing her right hand on her leg. To her left is the only male statue on the building; he rests his right arm on a stack of books and holds in his left hand a tablet. To the right of the central figure is a statue who holds a torch in her right hand and rests her left arm also on a stack of books. Directly below this grouping is a carving of the Seal of the State of Indiana, depicting a wooded scene with a hunter and buffalo and encircled with giant oak leaves symbolizing distinction. Above the arches of the doorway proper are two muses, or Greek goddesses. Depicted to preside over music, the one on the left holds a harp in her right hand; depicted to preside over painting, the one on the right displays a palette in her left hand.

Fifth Street entrance
Similar to Fourth Street, a grouping of three statues thought to represent justice is found above the Fifth Street entryway to the Old Courthouse. The central figure holds the scales of justice in her left hand, with a staff in her right hand. The symbolism of the three raised fingers at the top of her staff as well as the serpent intertwined in her hair is unclear. The statue on the left holds a tablet in her left hand while the statue on the right holds a torch in her right hand. Directly below this grouping again is found the Seal of the State of Indiana, and there are muses above the doorway arches. The one on the left holds a mallet in her left hand and a bust in her right hand, presiding over sculpture. The one on the right holds a book in her left hand, presiding over literature. Although it does not date back to 1890, the revolving door for entering the Fifth Street side of the building is one of the oldest revolving doors remaining in use in Evansville.

Vine Street entrance
There are some noticeable similarities between the Vine Street entryway of the Old Courthouse and the Court Street side. The American eagle again perches atop this side of the building, and the Roman numerals reading 1888 are again found below the eagle. However, the goddesses on this side of the building are different from those sculpted on Court Street. Facing the building, to the left sits the Goddess of Commerce and River Trade whose left hand rests on the prow of a boat, a chain and an anchor. She is surrounded by symbols of the late 19th century riverfront such as bales, barrels, and crates. To the right sits the Goddess of Learning with scrolls at her feet and a tablet in her right hand. Another similarity to Court Street is found above the arches to the doorway proper with the cherubs representing male and female being sculpted again. However, their positions have been reversed with the male being on the left and the female on the right side of the arches.

Notes

References

External links
 

Courthouses on the National Register of Historic Places in Indiana
Government buildings completed in 1890
Towers completed in 1890
Vanderburgh County Courthouse, Old
Buildings and structures in Evansville, Indiana
National Register of Historic Places in Evansville, Indiana
Towers in Indiana
Bell towers in the United States
Clock towers in Indiana
Beaux-Arts architecture in Indiana